Overhang may refer to:

 Debt overhang, a fiscal situation of a government
 Market overhang, a concept in marketing
 Monetary overhang, a phenomenon where people have money holdings due to the lack of ability to spend them
 Overhang seat, a constituency seat in excess of a party's entitlement
 Overhang (architecture), a protruding structure that may provide protection for lower levels, such as overhanging eaves
 Overhang (automotive), the part of a road vehicle's length that is outside of the wheelbase
 Overhang (rock formation), part of a rock face that exceeds the vertical

See also

 Underhang